Donald DeMag (December 15, 1922 – December 8, 1954) was the last person executed by the U.S. state of Vermont.

Life
Donald Edward DeMag was born in Burlington, Vermont on December 15, 1922.

Prior to his death sentence, DeMag had been sentenced to life imprisonment after being convicted of murder, and had escaped and been recaptured while trying to enter Canada.

In 1952, DeMag and fellow-prisoner Francis Blair escaped from the state prison in Windsor by crashing a laundry truck through the front gates.

While on the run, DeMag and Blair had attacked Elizabeth Weatherup and her husband in Springfield, Vermont. DeMag and Blair beat the couple with a lead pipe as they attempted to rob them. Weatherup died of her injuries. Two days after their escape, DeMag and Blair were recaptured.  They were tried for first-degree murder, convicted and sentenced to death by electric chair.

Blair and DeMag were both executed by electric chair. Blair was executed on February 8, 1954.

Death and burial
DeMag was executed at the prison in Windsor on December 8, 1954.  He was buried at Holy Family Cemetery in Essex Junction, Vermont.

Later death penalty case
Although DeMag was the last person executed by Vermont, he was not the last person to be sentenced to death by a Vermont court. Lionel Goyet, a soldier who was Absent Without Leave for the fifth time, robbed and killed a farmhand, and was sentenced to death in 1957.  His sentence was commuted six months later, and Goyet was conditionally pardoned in 1969.  He had no further problems with the law, and died in 1980.

The death penalty was effectively abolished by Vermont in 1965.  It remained as a possible sentence if a defendant was convicted of murdering a prison employee or law enforcement officer, but was never used.  As a result, the possibility of a death sentence in such cases was removed from state statutes by the Vermont General Assembly in 1987.

See also
 Capital punishment in Vermont
 List of most recent executions by jurisdiction
 John Stark Bellamy II (2007). Vintage Vermont Villainies: True Tales of Murder & Mystery from the 19th and 20th Centuries (Woodstock, Vt.: Countryman) 
 Daniel Allen Hearn (2008). Legal Executions in New England: A comprehensive reference, 1623–1960 (Jefferson, NC: McFarland) 
 Wilson Ring, "Death penalty comes full circle in Vt.", Rutland Herald, 2005-05-01

References

1922 births
1954 deaths
People from Burlington, Vermont
20th-century executions by Vermont
American people executed for murder
20th-century executions of American people
People convicted of murder by Vermont
People executed by Vermont by electric chair
American prisoners sentenced to life imprisonment
Prisoners sentenced to life imprisonment by Vermont
Burials in Vermont